Daniel Steven Nagin (born November 29, 1948) is an American criminologist, statistician, and the Teresa and H. John Heinz III University Professor of Public Policy and Statistics at Carnegie Mellon University's Heinz College.

Education
Nagin received his B.S. in Administrative and Managerial Sciences and M.S. in Industrial Administration from Carnegie Mellon University in 1971. He later received his Ph.D. from what is now the university's Heinz College in 1976.

Career
Nagin served as the Deputy Secretary for Fiscal Policy and Analysis in the Pennsylvania Department of Revenue from 1981 to 1986. He joined Carnegie Mellon University in 1986 as an associate professor of management in their School of Urban and Public Affairs. In 1990, he became a professor of management in Heinz College, a position he retained until 1998. He was also the research program area director of Carnegie Mellon University's National Consortium on Violence Research from 1997 to 2001. In 2006, he became the Associate Dean of Faculty at Heinz College, and in 2008, he became the Teresa and H. John Heinz III University Professor of Public Policy and Statistics there, positions he still holds as of December 2019.

Research
Nagin is known for researching the deterrence effect of criminal punishments, and he chaired the National Research Council’s Committee on Deterrence and the Death Penalty. In 2012, this committee released a report concluding that existing research on the deterrent effect of capital punishment is inconclusive. He has also researched the use of statistical methods for analyzing longitudinal data, as well as changes in criminal behavior over the human lifetime.

Honors and awards
Nagin, along with Joan Petersilia, received the Stockholm Prize in Criminology in 2014. He received the Edwin H. Sutherland Award from the American Society of Criminology in 2006. In 2017, he received the NAS Award for Scientific Reviewing from the U.S. National Academy of Sciences. He is also a fellow of the American Society of Criminology, American Association for the Advancement of Science, and the American Academy of Political and Social Science.

References

External links

1948 births
Living people
American criminologists
Carnegie Mellon University faculty
Heinz College of Information Systems and Public Policy alumni
Winners of the Stockholm Prize in Criminology
Fellows of the American Association for the Advancement of Science